The 1971–72 IHL season was the 27th season of the International Hockey League, a North American minor professional league. Eight teams participated in the regular season, and the Port Huron Wings won the Turner Cup.

Regular season

Turner Cup Playoffs

External links
 Season 1971/72 on hockeydb.com 

IHL
International Hockey League (1945–2001) seasons